The 1991 Torneo Descentralizado, the top tournament of Peruvian football, was played by 41 teams in the format of Regional Tournaments, whose winner advanced to national finals. The national champion was Sporting Cristal.

Regional I

Metropolitan

North

South

Central

Oriental

Octagonal

Liguilla Final

Regional I final

Regional II

Metropolitan 

Note: The championship was suspended after 9 games until mid-July. One player Hector Mathei (Deportivo Municipal) was killed and seven   other players injured in a bomb attack on a club dressing room (Deportivo Municipal vs Alianza Lima).

North

South

Central 

 Note: Two players and an official of the Union Minas (Central zone of the decentralized championship), were injured and a member of the coaching staff was killed when the team's bus was shot at as the squad returned from an away match. Highway robbers or terrorists were thought to be responsible. The central-zone championship, which qualified the winner for The final round, was suspended as a result.

Oriental

Octagonal

Liguilla Final

Regional II final

Title

Playoff for Copa Libertadores 1992

Aggregate tables (Regional I and Regional II)

Metropolitan

Norte

Playoff for Descentralizado 1992

South

Central

Relegation Playoff for Descentralizado 1992 (3rd South Zone / 2nd Center Zone)

Oriental

Relegation Playoff for Descentralizado 1992 (1st Oriental Zone / 2nd Oriental Zone)

External links
Peru 1991 season at RSSSF
Peruvian Football League News 

1991
Peru
Primera Division Peruana